Southern Avenue is one of three boundary streets between Washington, D.C., and the state of Maryland. Following a southwest-to-northeast line, Southern Avenue begins at the intersection of South Capitol Street in Southeast, Washington, D.C., and Indian Head Highway on the Maryland side.

Southern Avenue was built in pieces. For example, the portion between Benning Road SE and 46th Street SE was not started until 1928. One of the first residential developments on Southern Avenue was Fairfield, a cluster of luxury homes at the intersection of Highview Terrace SE and 34th Street SE in the Summit Park neighborhood.

The Southern Avenue bridge over Suitland Parkway was the first orthotropic deck girder bridge built in Washington, D.C.

References

Bibliography

Streets in Washington, D.C.